Moserius is a genus of crustacean in family Trichoniscidae, with two described species:

There are five described species:

 Moserius elbanus Taiti & Ferrara, 1995
 Moserius gruberae Taiti & Montesanto, 2018
 Moserius inexpectatus Reboleira & Taiti, 2015
 Moserius percoi Strouhal, 1940
 Moserius talamonensis Taiti & Montesanto, 2018

References

Woodlice
Taxonomy articles created by Polbot